Elvi Svendsen, later Carlsen (January 8, 1920 – February 7, 2013) was a Danish backstroke and freestyle swimmer who competed in the 1936 Summer Olympics and in the 1948 Summer Olympics.

She was born in Copenhagen. She was the daughter-in-law of Carl Carlsen and the sister-in-law of Inger Carlsen.

In 1936 she was a member of the Danish relay team which finished seventh in the 4×100 metre freestyle relay event. In the 100 metre freestyle competition she was eliminated in the first round.

Twelve years later she helped the Danish relay team to qualify for the final of the 4×100 metre freestyle relay event. The Danish team won the silver medal, but she did not compete in the final and was not awarded with a medal.

References

1920 births
2013 deaths
Danish female swimmers
Olympic swimmers of Denmark
Swimmers at the 1936 Summer Olympics
Swimmers at the 1948 Summer Olympics
World record setters in swimming
European Aquatics Championships medalists in swimming
Danish female backstroke swimmers
Danish female freestyle swimmers
Swimmers from Copenhagen